The streamer-tailed tyrant (Gubernetes yetapa) is a species of bird in the family Tyrannidae, the only one in the genus Gubernetes.

It is found in Argentina, Bolivia, Brazil, and Paraguay.
Its natural habitats are dry savanna and subtropical or tropical seasonally wet or flooded lowland grassland.

References

streamer-tailed tyrant
Birds of Brazil
Birds of Bolivia
Birds of Paraguay
streamer-tailed tyrant
Taxa named by Louis Jean Pierre Vieillot
Taxonomy articles created by Polbot